The Adin Supply Company, located on the west side of Main St. between Center and McDowell Sts. in Adin, California, was probably built in 1906.  The listing included two contributing buildings.

It has also been known as Big Valley Co-op Store.

It has siding of horizontal boards. Its roof, covered originally by shingles, is corrugated metal.

In 1996, it was the largest and oldest retail facility in Adin.

References

National Register of Historic Places in Modoc County, California
Buildings and structures completed in 1906
1906 establishments in California